This is a partial list of ghost towns in New Mexico in the United States of America.

Conditions
Ghost towns can include sites in various states of disrepair and abandonment. Some sites no longer have any trace of buildings or civilization and have reverted to empty land. Other sites are unpopulated but still have standing buildings. Still others may support full-time residents, though usually far less than at their historical peak, while others may now be museums or historical sites.

For ease of reference, the sites listed have been placed into one of the following general categories.

Barren site
 Site is no longer in existence
 Site has been destroyed, covered with water, or reverted to empty land
 May have a few difficult to find foundations/footings at most

Neglected site
 Little more than rubble remains at the site
 Dilapidated, often roofless buildings remain at the site

Abandoned site
 Building or houses still standing, but all or almost all are abandoned
 No population, with the possible exception of a caretaker
 Site no longer in use, except for one or two buildings

Semi-abandoned site
 Buildings or houses still standing, but most are abandoned
 A few residents may remain

Historic site
 Buildings or houses still standing
 Site has been converted to a historical site, museum, or tourist attraction
 Still a busy community, but population is smaller than its peak years

Ghost towns

See also
American Old West
New Mexico Territory

References

 
New Mexico
Ghost towns
Ghost towns in New Mexico